Constituency PK-22 (Charsadda-VI) was a constituency for the Khyber Pakhtunkhwa Assembly of the Khyber Pakhtunkhwa province of Pakistan.

See also
 Constituency PK-17 (Charsadda-I)
 Constituency PK-18 (Charsadda-II)
 Constituency PK-19 (Charsadda-III)
 Constituency PK-20 (Charsadda-IV)
 Constituency PK-21 (Charsadda-V)

References

External links 
 Khyber Pakhtunkhwa Assembly's official website
 Election Commission of Pakistan's official website
 Awaztoday.com Search Result
 Election Commission Pakistan Search Result

Khyber Pakhtunkhwa Assembly constituencies